Philip Joel Urry (born 5 January 1973), known by his stage name Phil Joel, is a New Zealand musician and  former bassist for the Christian rock group Newsboys.

Background
Philip Joel Urry was born in Auckland, New Zealand. He was lead singer and guitarist of the band Drinkwater. He joined the Newsboys as bassist in August 1994.

In June 2000, he released his first solo album, Watching Over You, on Inpop Records. He supported this album with the Strangely Normal Tour accompanied by LaRue, Luna Halo, Earthsuit, V*Enna & Katy Hudson (now known as Katy Perry).

His second solo album, Bring It On, was released in November 2002 also on Inpop. His third album, The deliberatePeople. Album was released on 18 November 2005 in conjunction with Phil and Heather Joel's newly founded Christian ministry, deliberatePeople. The album was praised for its stripped down rock, reminiscent of the Jesus Music era of Christian Music.

His wife, Heather, is a former host of All Access and Hit Trip on CMT. He met Heather at a radio station in her native Kansas. They were married in 1996 and have two children. 

In December 2006, Joel announced that he would be leaving the Newsboys in order to devote more time to his family. In September 2008, Joel released his fifth solo CD titled The New Normal, which was his third self-produced album.

Joel began the project Zealand Worship in 2015. 

In December 2017 it was announced that Joel would be joining his former Newsboys band mates on the year-long Newsboys United tour.

Joel's debut book, Redwoods & Whales, was released by Thomas Nelson on 16 April 2019.

In January 2021 Joel returned to his solo career, releasing the EP Better Than I Found It, which he recorded in his home studio during lockdown in New Zealand.

Discography

Zealand Worship
 Zealand Worship - The EP (Word Records/Warner Bros. Records, 2015)
 Liberated (Word Records/Warner Bros. Records, 2018)

Newsboys
 Take Me To Your Leader (Star Song Communications, 1996)
 Step Up to the Microphone (Sparrow Records, 1998)
 Love Liberty Disco (Sparrow Records, 1999)
 Thrive (Sparrow Records, 2002)
 Adoration: The Worship Album (Sparrow Records, 2003)
 Devotion (Sparrow Records, 2004)
 Go (Inpop Records, 2006)
 United (Fair Trade Services, 2019)

Albums
 Watching Over You (Inpop Records, 2000)
 Bring it On (Inpop Records, 2002)
 The deliberatePeople. Album (2005)
 deliberateKids (2007)
 The New Normal (2008)
 deliberateKids 2 (2010)
 Playlist (2012)
 Better Than I Found It (2021)

Singles
 "God Is Watching Over You" (2000, Watching Over You) – Christian CHR No. 2, Christian AC No. 9
 "Strangely Normal" (2000, Watching Over You) – Christian CHR No. 5
 "Author of Life" (2000, Watching Over You)
 "Be Number One" (2000, Watching Over You)
 "I Adore You" (2002, Bring It On) – Christian AC No. 21
 "Resolution" (2002, Bring It On)
 "No Longer" (2002, Bring It On)
 "The Man You Want Me to Be" (2002, Bring It On) – Billboard Christian Songs No. 22, Christian AC No. 15
 "Changed" (2006, The deliberatePeople. Album)
 "Good Good Father" (2015, Zealand Worship - The EP)
 "Your Love is Wild" (2016, Your Love is Wild - Single)
 "Spirit Sing" (2018, Liberated)

References

1973 births
Living people
New Zealand bass guitarists
Male bass guitarists
New Zealand Christians
New Zealand pop singers
People from Auckland
Inpop Records artists
New Zealand expatriates in the United States
Newsboys members
21st-century New Zealand male singers
21st-century bass guitarists
Peter Furler Band members
New Zealand male guitarists